Anna Maria Gherardi (15 October 1939 – 5 October 2014) was an Italian actress and voice actress.

Born in Bologna, Gherardi formed at the drama school of the Piccolo Teatro in Milan, and debuted on stage in 1960, in Adelchi alongside Vittorio Gassman.

She was later active in the avant-garde theatre, and worked with notable directors such as Luca Ronconi and Maurizio Scaparro. In films, she was often cast in character roles, and she worked with Bernardo Bertolucci, Franco Battiato and Pasquale Festa Campanile, among others. She was also active as a voice actress in documentaries and radio dramas, and in dubbing lines in foreign films.

Filmography

References

External links
 

1939 births
2014 deaths
Actors from Bologna
Italian film actresses
20th-century Italian actresses
Italian stage actresses
Italian television actresses
Italian voice actresses